The California Shenandoah Valley AVA is an American Viticultural Area that includes portions of Amador County and El Dorado County, California, United States.  It is a sub-region of the Sierra Foothills AVA, and close in proximity to the Fiddletown AVA. The region was settled by non-indigenous peoples during the California Gold Rush in the nineteenth century, and settlers in the region began planting grapevines and producing wine soon thereafter.  In the 1970s, Sutter Home Winery began bottling varietal Zinfandel wines made from Shenandoah Valley grapes, and in 1983 the region became a designated AVA.  The most important grape variety in the region is Zinfandel, with Primitivo and Barbera close behind.

References 

Geography of Amador County, California
American Viticultural Areas
American Viticultural Areas of California
Geography of El Dorado County, California
1982 establishments in California